Sergei Sergeyevich Shchegléiev (or Shchegleev, Stchegleev, Stschegleew) (transliteration from Cyrillic: Серге́й Серге́евич Щегле́ев) (1820 - 1859) was a Russian botanist, Ph.D. in botany, and associate professor at the Department of Botany at the National University of Kharkiv.

He was a taxonomist specialist of the family Epacridaceae, with an emphasis on Leucopogon. He regularly published in the Bulletin of the Société Impériale des Naturalistes de Moscou.

References

External link
Sergej Sergeevitch Stscheglejew - Wikispecies

19th-century botanists from the Russian Empire
1820 births
1859 deaths